Feleke is a surname. Notable people with the surname include:

Bashay Feleke (1917–2008), Ethiopian long-distance runner
Getu Feleke (born 1986), Ethiopian long-distance runner
Sisaye Feleke (born 1947), Ethiopian sprinter

See also
Zeleke